Connecticut's 6th congressional district is a former district, which was eliminated in 2003, following the 2000 Census. In 1965, following passage of the Voting Rights Act, it was re-established.

During redistricting in 2002, a majority of the district was merged with the 5th district.

Prior to its elimination, the district included Litchfield County, the Farmington Valley, and commununties surrounding Hartford, including Bristol, Enfield, and New Britain.

List of members representing the district

References

 Congressional Biographical Directory of the United States 1774–present

6
Former congressional districts of the United States
1837 establishments in Connecticut
Constituencies established in 1837
1843 disestablishments in Connecticut
Constituencies disestablished in 1843
1965 establishments in Connecticut
Constituencies established in 1965
2003 disestablishments in Connecticut
Constituencies disestablished in 2003